The Center for Art, New Ventures and Sustainable Development (CANVAS) is a nonprofit organization that promotes Philippine art and culture.

Notable programs 

Founded in 2005 by Gigo Alampay, CANVAS maintains two major programs.

Through its "One Million Books for One Million Filipino Children" Campaign, it organizes writing competitions for Filipino authors, and engages local visual artists to publish full color books that are donated to children in poor communities of the Philippines.

Its second program is the Looking for Juan Program. According to CANVAS, the program organizes visual art exhibitions designed to explore the use of art to drive debate and discussion on selected social issues, particularly national identity, free expression, technology and culture, and sustainable development.

References

External links

 Center for Art, New Ventures & Sustainable Development  (CANVAS) at Google Cultural Institute

Arts organizations established in 2005